Boxer Stadium (also known as Matthew J. Boxer Stadium) is a soccer stadium in San Francisco, California. Located in Balboa Park, the stadium has a capacity of 3,500. It is owned and operated by the San Francisco Recreation & Parks Department and is the only public soccer-specific stadium in San Francisco.  Boxer Stadium is the primary home of the century-old San Francisco Soccer Football League.

History
Boxer Stadium opened September 27, 1953 as the Balboa Park Soccer Stadium at a cost of $150,000.   The concrete bleachers were added later after the November 1953 Proposition G bond passage.  The stadium was renamed in honor of the late SFSFL President, Matthew J. Boxer in the 1990s.

Boxer Stadium served as the main venue of the 1982 Gay Games.

Tenants
The stadium is home to the San Francisco Soccer Football League,  the Golden Gate Women's Soccer League,  and the San Francisco Unified School District CIF high school and middle school soccer.

For the 2013 season the San Francisco Stompers FC of the National Premier Soccer League played their home games at Boxer Stadium.

High school Lacrosse teams from SHC also use Boxer Stadium.

Rugby and Gaelic Athletic Association teams had used Boxer Stadium until the opening of Ray Sheeran Field on Treasure Island in 2005. In 2016, Boxer Stadium was the home pitch for the San Francisco Rush professional rugby team in the new PRO Rugby competition in the United States, however, the team was folded by the league after one season citing an unsuitable venue.

USA Internationals
Boxer Stadium has hosted 16 USA Eagles international rugby union matches. It was the unofficial home of the Eagles from 1996 to 2000, hosting 12 of their 17 test matches. The results are as follows:

Updated 30 April 2021

References

External links
 SF Recreation & Parks Department

Soccer venues in San Francisco
Rugby union stadiums in San Francisco
Sports venues completed in 1953
1953 establishments in California
Defunct National Premier Soccer League stadiums
Ultimate (sport) venues